The locomotives of the Dundalk, Newry and Greenore Railway were all 0-6-0ST (saddle tanks), with inside cylinders, to the designs of LNWR Chief Mechanical Engineer, John Ramsbottom, the first three locomotives being built by the LNWR Crewe Works, England, in 1873. Later, to work the extension of the line to Newry, two similar locos were built at Crewe in 1876. The sixth and final locomotive was added in 1898. The locomotives were consecutively numbered, in order of building, from 1 to 6 and also carried names (see table). Locomotive No.5 Carlingford was withdrawn in 1928 and scrapped.

During World War II three of the remaining 5 locomotives were loaned to the L.M.S. Northern Counties Committee for shunting duties around York Road, Belfast but were returned due to not being satisfactory to NCC's needs. The line closed on 31 December 1951, and although the stock list showed 5 steam locomotives only one was serviceable, No. 2 Greenore. Also on the final stock list was a petrol railcar. No. 1 'Macrory' lay in store at Adelaide, Belfast for possible preservation but was scrapped. The remaining 4 locomotives 2 'Greenore', 3 'Dundalk', 4 'Newry' and 6 'Holyhead' were scrapped by Hammond Land Foundry in Sutton, Co. Dublin.

Locomotives 

Livery was black

Preservation 
Consideration was given to the preservation of locomotive No.1 Macrory but, in the end, no locomotives were preserved. It is believed that this is due to an ill-informed belief among those in charge of its fate that the locomotive was of a different track gauge to the rest of Ireland, due to the fact that it was built and owned by a British company, however this was not the case. Only a 6-wheel composite coach was saved and can now be found in the Ulster Folk and Transport Museum, Cultra, Co. Down. However, a GNR(I) 2-4-2t JT class locomotive, No. 93 which worked on the Greenore line has also been preserved and is displayed with the DNGR coach in Cultra. All the locomotive nameplates, are also preserved.

See also
Dundalk, Newry and Greenore Railway

External links
  Dundalk, Newry and Greenore Railway

0-6-0ST locomotives
Steam locomotives of Ireland
Railway locomotives introduced in 1873
Scrapped locomotives
5 ft 3 in gauge locomotives